{|

|}

West Seattle was a side-wheel driven steam-powered ferry built in 1907.

Design and construction
West Seattle was built in 1907 at Tacoma, Washington at the Heath yard for the West Seattle Land and Improvement Company.  The vessel was intended to augment the company's ferry service, then being handled by the smaller ferry City of Seattle across Elliott Bay from Seattle to West Seattle, where the company was engaged in real estate development.

Career
The West Seattle, which was built at Tacoma and entered regular service on June 27, 1907 on the Seattle – West Seattle route.  City of Seattle was then shifted to run to the Luna amusement park then located at Duwamish Head.  1907 was the peak year for ferry transport on the Seattle-West Seattle run, with 103,000 passengers carried in July alone.  After that, rising competition from the expanding network of street car lines over time proved too much for the West Seattle ferries, and City of Seattle was taken off the route in 1911.  West Seattle was kept on the run, and in June 1913, the money-losing ferry was sold to the Port of Seattle.

The Port of Seattle operated the ferry until September 22, 1919, when the Port donated the ferry to King County.  King County was unable to make a profit from the vessel.  King County attempted to be used on the Seattle – Tacoma route, but there was insufficient interest.  In 1920, King County replaced West Seattle on the Elliott Bay route with the small Lake Washington steamer Aquilo.  King County then leased West Seattle to the Kitsap County Transportation Company, which operated the ferry occasionally as a relief vessel on the ferry route to Vashon Island.  Otherwise it kept West Seattle laid up at Houghton, on Lake Washington.

Kitsap County Transportation Co. subleased West Seattle to Pierce County from May to September 1921.  Pierce County used the ferry on the Tacoma – Gig Harbor run, for which it charged 50 cents for automobiles, a fee which has been called "nominal".

West Seattle was later converted to a barge, and was used to store fish nets.  The hull was still in use as an oil storage barge as late as 1951, and possibly 1960.

Notes

References
 Kline, M.S., and Bayless, G.A., Ferryboats -- A legend on Puget Sound, Bayless Books, Seattle, WA 1983  
 Newell, Gordon R. ed., H.W. McCurdy Marine History of the Pacific Northwest,  Superior Publishing, Seattle WA 1966 
 Newell, Gordon R., Ships of the Inland Sea -- The Story of the Puget Sound Steamboats, Binford & Mort (2d Ed. 1960)
 U.S. Dept. of the Treasury, Bureau of Statistics, Annual List of Merchant Vessels of the United States (for year ending June 30, 1909)

External links 
 West Seattle ferry terminal, showing West Seattle docked, with yachts moored in background.  Apparently used for a postcard.  Otto T. Frasch photographer, image #332.
 West Seattle moored at Dockton, Washington, August 14, 1946.  The ferry is apparently out of use, but upper works still intact and machinery possibly still installed, as smokestack still in place.  Oliver S. Van Olinda photographer, University of Washington digital image #VAN206.
 West Seattle departing West Seattle ferry dock.  Photograph shows Smith Tower, apparently completed, which allows dating of image to some time between 1914 and 1920.  Calvin F. Todd photographer, University of Washington digital image CFT0110.
 West Seattle at the Seattle ferry terminal, circa 1908.  This stereograph shows two people in a rowboat or canoe close to the vessel.  The ferry appears to have very few passengers on board.  Duwamish Head and West Seattle can be seen in background.  Unknown photographer, University of Washington digital image, Museum of History & Industry Photograph Collection, image 1974.5868.437

See also 
 City of Seattle (steam ferry)
 Ferries in Washington State

Transportation in Seattle
Ferries of Washington (state)
1907 ships
Ships built in Tacoma, Washington
Steamboats of Washington (state)
Steam ferries of Washington (state)